San Mommè, also spelled Sammommè, is an Italian village and hamlet (frazione) of the municipality of Pistoia, in the province of Pistoia, Tuscany. In 2011 it had a population of 177.

Geography
The village is located in the Tuscan-Emilian Apennine Mountains, nearby the borders of Emilia-Romagna. It is 11 km from Pracchia, 14 from Pistoia and 22 from Porretta Terme. It is served by a station on the Porrettana railway Bologna-Pistoia.

Personalities
AG Fronzoni (1923-2002), graphic designer

References

External links

Frazioni of the Province of Pistoia
Pistoia